Arthur Rupert Dickey,  (August 18, 1854 – July 3, 1900) was a Canadian politician.

Born in Amherst, Nova Scotia, the son of Robert Barry Dickey, he was a lawyer before being elected to the House of Commons of Canada in an 1888 by-election in the riding of Cumberland after Charles Tupper was named High Commissioner for Canada in the United Kingdom. A Conservative, he was re-elected in 1891 and 1896. He was Minister of Justice and Attorney General of Canada, Minister of Militia and Defence, and Secretary of State of Canada.

He died by drowning at Amherst, Nova Scotia on July 3, 1900.

Electoral record

References

External links
 

1854 births
1900 deaths
Accidental deaths in Nova Scotia
Deaths by drowning in Canada
Conservative Party of Canada (1867–1942) MPs
Members of the House of Commons of Canada from Nova Scotia
Members of the King's Privy Council for Canada